Khruangbin (เครื่องบิน) is an American musical trio from Houston, Texas. The band comprises Laura Lee on bass, Mark Speer on guitar, and Donald "DJ" Johnson Jr. on drums.

The band is known for blending global music influences, such as classic soul, dub, rock and psychedelia. Their debut studio album, The Universe Smiles Upon You (2015), draws from the history of Thai music in the 1960s, specifically from Luk thung, while their second album, Con Todo el Mundo (2018), has influences from Spain and the Middle East, specifically Iran. Speer, Lee, and DJ also host "AirKhruang" radio shows on NTS Radio and Facebook Live. In September 2022, the band released the album Ali in collaboration with Vieux Farka Touré, featuring songs by Vieux's father, Ali Farka Touré.

Background
Speer and Johnson met in 2004 while playing in Rudy Rasmus' St. John's Methodist Church gospel band in Houston, Texas. The church employed Speer as the guitarist and Johnson as the organist.

In 2007, Speer met Lee through friends, where they initially connected over a shared love of Afghan music and Middle Eastern architecture. In 2009, Lee started to learn the bass with guidance from Speer. After playing for six months, she auditioned and got the gig to be the bassist for Yppah on his upcoming tour. Speer already had the gig as guitarist for Yppah and had encouraged Lee to audition. In 2010, both Lee and Speer went on tour with Yppah who opened for Bonobo.

The tour motivated the two of them to make music together more seriously, leading them to form Khruangbin. Speer and Lee went to a barn where they developed the bass-heavy, psychedelic sound that became the basis of the band's aesthetic. Upon their return, they asked Johnson to join the band as drummer, to play simple break-beats under the guitar and bass. The barn, located in the 300-person town of Burton, Texas, would become the site of all future Khruangbin recording sessions. The band has a long-term working relationship with Houston-based engineer Steve Christensen.

When asked to play their first gig, Lee, who was learning to speak Thai at the time, decided they should use her favorite Thai word "khruangbin", which means "airplane", as their name. Speer said that, had they had the foresight to predict the band's success, they might not have chosen a name that was so difficult to pronounce. The band's name symbolizes the international set of influences that shaped the band's formation.

Speer described the band's creative process as focused."When we first started the band, we wanted to have a formula,” he says. “It’s like, ‘This is what we do, and we’re not gonna try and go outside the box too much. We’re gonna explore the box we’re in. I’ve always been a big fan of that. I used to be in bands where was like, ‘Man, we’ve gotta think outside the box!’ And all I’m thinking is: ‘You guys don’t even know.’ Music should never be just for the sake of being experimental. Before you even start, you have to know what you’re experimenting with first.”A notable part of the band's visual style is the black wigs that Lee and Speer wear on stage, and during promotional interviews and photoshoots.

Career

After Khruangbin toured with Bonobo, they featured their song "Calf Born in Winter" on his 2014 Late Night Tales compilation. The song became one of the most popular tracks on the record, helping create an initial audience for the band's first EP, History of Flight, and debut record, The Universe Smiles Upon You, in 2015.

Shortly thereafter, Khruangbin were named The Guardians "New Band of the Week," opening for acts like Father John Misty, Tycho, Chicano Batman, and Massive Attack. They also joined the festival circuit, playing a string of festivals like Lockn, Glastonbury, Bonnaroo, ACL, Outside Lands, Desert Daze, and South by Southwest.

In 2017, the band covered Ma Beham Nemiresim by Googoosh, a popular Iranian songstress, for the Philia: Artists Rise Against Islamophobia compilation, and created a Tehran-specific playlist on Spotify, in addition to many other city-specific playlists, as part of their AirKhruang DJ series.
 
In January 2018, Khruangbin released their second album, Con Todo el Mundo. The title of the album came from Laura Lee's Mexican-American grandfather, who would often ask, "How do you love me?" ("¿Cómo me quieres?") and would only accept one response, "Con todo el mundo" or, in English, "with all the world." The band said the title of the record is also a reference to the diverse range of musical influences that inspired it, primarily from the Middle East. Later in the year they recorded live for Spotify an arrangement of the Indian song "Khuda Bhi Aasman Se", played by Mohammed Rafi in the movie Dharti.

They opened for Leon Bridges on his 2018 tour, as well as Trey Anastasio's Ghosts of the Forest tour in 2019. In 2019, Trey Anastasio also joined Khruangbin on stage at Lockn' Music Festival. In 2020, the group was featured on the cover of Relix. 

Khruangbin's third studio album, Mordechai, was released in June 2020 on Dead Oceans. Three singles were released from the album, "Time (You & I)", "So We Won't Forget", and  "Pelota". The band also relaunched their AirKhruang DJ series, and the following year appeared on Austin City Limits performing with Leon Bridges.

The band's live appearances in 2022 included at St David's Hall for 6 Music Festival in Cardiff, the Park Stage at the Glastonbury Festival, and headlining the Cross The Tracks Festival in South London.

On September 23, 2022, the band released the album Ali, a collaboration with Vieux Farka Touré, featuring eight tracks of covers of songs by Vieux's father, Ali Farka Touré.

Style 
Khruangbin's musical genre is a hotly debated topic amongst critics. Mostly instrumental, the band's sound has been described as soul, surf rock, psychedelic, rock, dub and funk, with one website even describing them as "electronic". The most commonly used term to describe Khruangbin's music is Thai funk, though the band members themselves challenge the convention of genres, publicly refusing to be pigeonholed into one particular label. As music journalist Rob Shepherd noted for PostGenre, "the [name Khruangbin], which translates to 'flying engine' or airplane in Thai, is perfect for their music as it often crosses borders and cultures."

Band members 

 Laura Lee Ochoa – bass, vocals
 Mark Speer – guitars, vocals
 Donald "DJ" Johnson – drums, keyboards, piano, vocals

Discography

Studio albums

EPs 
The Infamous Bill (2014)
History of Flight (2015)
Spotify Singles (2018) 
Texas Sun (with Leon Bridges) (2020)
Texas Moon (with Leon Bridges) (2022) - No. 23 Billboard 200

Compilation albums 
全てが君に微笑む (2019, Night Time Stories; Beat Records)

Remix albums 
Hasta El Cielo (2019, Dead Oceans; Night Time Stories)
Late Night Tales: Khruangbin (2020, Night Time Stories)
Mordechai Remixes (2021, Dead Oceans)

Singles

Live recordings 
Live @ Helios (2012, Hightower Records)
Live at Lincoln Hall (2018, Dead Oceans; Night Time Stories)
Live at Arcosanti, Arizona (2019, FORM Arcosanti Festival)

Notes

References

American musical trios
Musical groups from Houston
Dead Oceans artists
Night Time Stories artists